Barley bread is a type of bread made from barley flour derived from the grain of the barley plant. In the British Isles it is a bread which dates back to the Iron Age. Today, barley flour is commonly blended (in a smaller proportion) with wheat flour to make conventional breadmaking flour.

Religious references

A loaf of barley bread features in a dream mentioned in : a Midianite man dreamt that "a loaf of barley bread tumbled into the camp of Midian; it came to a tent and struck it so that it fell and overturned, and the tent collapsed"; Israelite leader Gideon overheard an account of the dream and concluded that he was assured of victory over the Midianites.

Loaves made of barley feature in the story of the feeding of the 5000 in John's Gospel in the New Testament.

It is often mentioned in Islamic sources as a commoner's food in comparison with wheat bread, perceived as a sort of luxury item. In the Muwatta Imam Malik (hadith 1700) it is narrated that Jesus the son of Mary used to say, "O Bani Israil! You must drink pure water and the green things of the land and barley bread. Beware of wheat bread, for you will not be grateful enough for it." Another narration from Sahih Bukhari (5413) gives a detailed comparison between sifted, fine flour and unsifted flour for making barley bread: I asked Sahl bin Sa`d, "Did Allah's Messenger ever eat white flour?" Sahl said, "Allah's Messenger never saw white flour since Allah sent him as an Apostle till He took him unto Him." I asked, "Did the people have (use) sieves during the lifetime of Allah's Messenger?" Sahl said, "Allah's Messenger never saw (used) a sieve since Allah sent him as a prophet until He took him unto Him," I said, "How could you eat barley unsifted?" he said, "We used to grind it and then blow off its husk, and after the husk flew away, we used to prepare the dough (bake) and eat it."

See also
Balep korkun
Bannock
Chalboribbang, a Korean barley pancake or "sticky barley bread"
Gyabrag, a Tibetan barley pancake
Malt loaf
Rye bread

References

External links
Ancient barley bread

Barley
Barley-based dishes